Prithviraj Road (Hindi: पृथ्वीराज मार्ग, Urdu: پرتھوی راج مارگ Pṛthvīrāj Mārg) is one of the historic & influential roads of New Delhi. It houses the most elite residences of major people of India.

North End
It stretches from the Taj Mansingh Hotel at the junction of Man Singh Road, Dr APJ Abdul Kalam Road, Humayun Road, Shahjahan Road, a road to Khan Market.

South End
It stretches up to the junction of Sri Aurobindo Marg Road, Safdarjung road and Tughlaq road.
This is near Safdarjung's Tomb.

Important buildings
Rajasthan House
Meghalaya House
 Jindal House
J&K House
Official Language institution, or Kendriya Hindi/ Rajbhasha Sansthan
L.K.Advani's house: 30, Prithviraj Road.
Cabinet Secretary's earmarked residence: 32, Prithviraj Road.

Crossings
Dr APJ Abdul Kalam Road (Prev. Known as Aurangzeb Road).
South End Road.

References

External links
This road can be traced at  

Roads in Delhi
Streets in New Delhi